Daryl Lynn Hunt (November 3, 1956 – July 9, 2010) was a professional American football player, a linebacker for six seasons for the Houston Oilers appearing in 78 career regular season games after being selected by Houston during the 6th round of the 1979 NFL Draft.

Early life
Hunt was born in Odessa, Texas the son of educators Walter and Elayne Hunt. He was the first African-American to play football at Permian High School.

College career
Hunt played linebacker and remains the OU career record-holder for tackles with 530. He had three of the best six single-season tackle totals (157 in 1978, 159 in 1977 and 177 in 1976). He earned all-Big Eight status three-times and was selected as an All-American in 1977 and 1978, and won the Outland Trophy Award.

Pro career

Hunt was drafted in the sixth round of the 1979 NFL Draft by the Houston Oilers, and played 73 games from 1979 to 1983. He retired in 1984 due to a knee injury.

Death
Hunt died at age 53 of a massive heart attack while jogging in Houston on July 9, 2010.

References

External links
Oklahoma Sooners bio

1956 births
2010 deaths
People from Odessa, Texas
Players of American football from Texas
American football linebackers
Oklahoma Sooners football players
Houston Oilers players
Permian High School alumni